First Parrikar cabinet was the Council of Ministers in Goa Legislative Assembly headed by Chief Minister Manohar Parrikar.

Council members 
 Ravi Naik
 Ramakant Khalap
 Digambar Kamat
 Sheikh Hassan Haroon
 Prakash Velip
 Pandurang Raut
 Manohar Ajgaonkar
 Filipe Nery Rodrigues
 Jose Philip D'Souza
 Ramarao Desai
 Suresh Amonkar
 Sanjay Bandekar
 Prakash Phadte

References 

Bharatiya Janata Party state ministries
Maharashtrawadi Gomantak Party
Goa ministries
Cabinets established in 2000
2000 establishments in Goa
2005 disestablishments in India
Cabinets disestablished in 2005